Marcello Visconti di Modrone (18 December 1898 – 5 August 1964) was an Italian businessman and fascist politician. He was a member of the House of Visconti.

References

1898 births
1964 deaths
Mayors of Milan
20th-century Italian politicians
20th-century Italian businesspeople
Italian fascists
Marcello Visconti di Modrone